Ljubomir Pavićević Fis (in Serbian Cyrillic: Љубомир Павићевић Фис; Višegrad, 6 February 1927 – Belgrade, 25 September 2015) was a Serbian graphic and industrial designer since 1953. According to the Belgrade Museum of Applied Arts, he is Serbia's oldest and most well-known designer.

Biography
Fis worked for numerous Yugoslav and foreign factories, firms and institutions, and his projects are realized in hundreds of thousands copies. One of his noted designs was emblem for the Unispace 82 UN conference.

He was one of founders, professor, head of the Packaging department and President of the Experts Consortium of the Belgrade School of Design, and guest professor at Faculty of Applied Arts.

Fis is a member of "The Applied Artists and Designers Association of Serbia" (ULUPUDS) since its establishment in 1953, and was also a member of several international professional associations.

He participated at International Symposium of Packaging Design held in Zagreb 1962., at Congress of ICSID (International Council of Societies of Industrial Design) in Spain 1971, as well as at the great number of professional meetings and magazines in Yugoslavia.

He was member of juries oat at BIO 3rd International Biennal of Industrial Design in Ljubljana 1968, Octobar Salon i Belgrade and many other.
Pavićević Fis was part of the Artistic Council of ULUPUDS, and its Representative in various governmental and cultural institutions of Yugoslavia.

Mr. Fis have realised total designs for numerous Yugoslav appearances at international economic fairs and cultural manifestations in: Munich, Düsseldorf, Berlin, Frankfurt, Hannover, Paris, Oslo, Bruxelles, Milano, Poznan, Plovdiv, Salonika, Tel Aviv, Mexico City, Panama City, Beijing, Shanghai, Hong Kong, Singapore, Jakarta, Kuwait, Tehran, New Delhi, Kiev, Moscow, Aschabad, Tashkent, Maputo, Duala and Addis Ababa.

Exhibitions

Solo exhibitions:
 1970. Solo Exhibition of industrial and graphic design "Designed by Fis 1961-68" , Belgrade, Srb.
 2008. Solo Retrospective Exhibition "Half Century of Fis’s Design" , MAA, Belgrade, Srb.

 1955. 1st Exhibition of ULUPUS, Belgrade, Srb.
 1956. 1st Salon of Applied Arts, Belgrade, Srb.
 1956. 2nd Exhibition of ULUPUS, Belgrade, Srb.
 1956. Yugoslav Exhibition Art & Industry, Belgrade, Srb.
 1957. Art & Industry, Novi Sad, Srb.
 1957. 3rd Exhibition of ULUPUS, Belgrade, Srb.
 1958. Art in the Service of Man, Zrenjanin, Srb.
 1958. 4th Exhibition of ULUPUS, Belgrade, Srb.
 1959. Art & Industry, Novi Sad, Srb.
 1961. Youth Forum, Novi Sad, Srb.
 1961. 9th Exhibition of Packaging, Belgrade, Srb.
 1961. Art in Industry, Belgrade, Srb.
 1962. 6th International Fair of Packaging, Zagreb, Cro.
 1962. Yugoslav Exhibition "Visual communications", Belgrade, Zagreb, Ljubljana, Skopje
 1962. Yugoslav Exhibition "Design of Industrial Products", Slovengradec, Slo.
 1963. 9th Exhibition of ULUPUS
 1964. 1st Yugoslav Exhibition of Economic Propaganda and Publicity, Belgrade, Srb.
 1965. Applied Arts of Serbia, Belgrade, Srb.
 1965. Exhibition "Economic Propaganda in Yugoslavia"
 1965. Yugoslav Poster, SSSR, Polska, Czechoslovakia, Romania
 1966. 7 October Salon, Belgrade, Srb.
 1966. 1st Salon of Applied Arts, Belgrade, Srb.
 1966. Exhibition "Economic propaganda" , Belgrade, Srb.
 1967. Forma, Bratislava, Czechoslovakia
 1968. BIO 3. International Biennal of Industrial Design, Ljubljana, Slo.
 1969. 10 October Salon, Belgrade, Srb.
 1971. Poster Exhibition, Ljubljana, Slo.
 1971. 12 October Salon, Belgrade, Srb.
 1972. May Salon – Eksperiment 4, ULUPUS, Belgrade, Srb.
 1973. BIO 5. International Biennal of Industrial Design, Ljubljana, Slo.
 1973. May Salon – Experiment 5, ULUPUDS, Belgrade, Srb.
 1973. Exhibition "Political Poster" , Belgrade, Srb.
 1973. Poster Exhibition, Ljubljana, Slo.
 1974. May Salon – Experiment 6, ULUPUDS, Belgrade, Srb.
 1974. Exhibition "Belgrade’s Political Poster 1944-74" , Belgrade, Srb.
 1975. ZGRAF ’75 - Graphic design, Zagreb, Cro.
 1975. May Salon – Experiment 7, ULUPUDS, Belgrade, Srb. 
 1975. 16 October Salon, Belgrade, Srb.
 1975. Artists of Block 45, Belgrade, Srb.
 1975. BIO 6. International Biennal of Industrial Design, Ljubljana, Slo.
 1975. Design ‘75, Belgrade, Srb.
 1975. Exhibition of Posters from Open Competition announced by the City Conference of SSRN, Belgrade
 1976. 8 May Exhibition of ULUPUDS, Belgrade, Srb.
 1976. Exhibition of ULUPUDS, Belgrade, Kraljevo, Nish, Zajechar, Uzhice, Gornji Milanovac, Srb.
 1978. 10 May Exhibition of ULUPUDS, Belgrade, Srb.
 1978. 19 October Salon, Belgrade, Srb.
 1978. Open October Salon, Zemun, Belgrade, Srb.
 1978. Design in Serbia, Belgrade, Srb.
 1978. Exhibition of Posters from Open Competition announced by City Conference of SSRN, Belgrade 
 1979. 11 May Exhibition of ULUPUDS, Belgrade, Srb.
 1979. Applied Art and Industrial Design in Serbia
 1980. 22nd Golden Pen of Belgrade, Belgrade, Srb.
 1980. 21 October Salon, Belgrade, Srb.
 1982. Design in Serbia, Belgrade, Srb.
 1982. The Exposition of ULUPUDS members in the Yugoslav Press and Cultural Center, New York, USA
 1982. 24th Golden Pen of Belgrade, Belgrade, Srb.
 1982. 14 May Exhibition of ULUPUDS, Belgrade, Srb.
 1982. Yugoslav Engaged Poster, Belgrade, Srb.
 1982. Contemporary Graphic Design, Belgrade, Srb.
 1985. 26 October Salon, Belgrade, Srb.
 1987. 28 October Salon, Belgrade, Srb.
 1996. 37 October Salon, Belgrade, Srb.
 1999. 40 October Salon, Belgrade, Srb.
 2000. 32 May Exhibition of ULUPUDS, Belgrade, Srb.
 2005. Exhibition of Design Section of ULUPUDS "Bgd Live" , Belgrade, Srb.
 2006. 38 May Exhibition ULUPUDS, Belgrade, Srb.
 2007. Exhibition of the Design Section of ULUPUDS – ‘Big Spring Cleanup’, Belgrade, Srb.
 2009. Mixer Design Expo, BDW, Belgrade, Serbia

Prizes and recognitions
 1960. Annual Prize of ULUPUS, Belgrade
 1961. Plaque of ULUPUS for Prominent Artistic Work
 1961. October Prize of the City of Belgrade
 1961. Yugoslav "OSCAR" for Packaging Design
 1962. Great Prize on Yugoslav Exhibition "Visual Communications"
 1965. Annual Prize of ULUPUS, Belgrade
 1965. First Prize for the Design on Yugoslav Exhibition EKOPROP
 1971. Annual Prize of  ULUPUS, Belgrade
 1972. Plaque of May Salon – Experiment 4, Belgrade
 1973. Prize of May Salon – Experiment 5, Belgrade
 1974. Annual Prize of ULUPUDS
 1975. Annual Prize of ULUPUDS
 1976. Plaque and Diploma by 8 May Exhibition of ULUPUDS
 1978. Plaque of ULUPUDS for Prominent Artistic Work
 1979. Diploma with Plaque for contribution of Artistic and Organizational Affirmation of ULUPUDS 
 1982. Status of Prominent Artist of ULUPUDS

          Twenty-seven First Prizes on Competitions for Industrial and Graphic Design

 1993. Charter of School for Design for Extraordinary Merit and Contribution in Constituting and Achieved   Results in the First Years of the School
 1998. Prise for Lifetime Achievement of Association of Artists of Applied Arts and Designers of Serbia
 2008. Special Acknowledgement by Government of Republic Serbia for Highest Level Contribution to National Culture of Serbia.

References

1927 births
2015 deaths
Serbian designers